The Dominion Post can refer to one of two newspapers:

 The Dominion Post (Wellington), a newspaper published in the capital of New Zealand
 The Dominion Post (Morgantown), a newspaper in the U.S. state of West Virginia